Babacar Niang (born 9 September 1958) is a retired Senegalese-French middle distance runner who specialized in the 800 metres.  He remains the national record holder in the 1000 metres dating back to 1983.  In 1995, he briefly held the masters M35 world record for 800m, which lasted only a month before his contemporary Johnny Gray contested and beat the record.

Achievements

External links

1958 births
Living people
Senegalese male middle-distance runners
Athletes (track and field) at the 1984 Summer Olympics
Athletes (track and field) at the 1988 Summer Olympics
Athletes (track and field) at the 1992 Summer Olympics
Olympic athletes of Senegal
French sportspeople of Senegalese descent